IZ (Hangul: 아이즈 pronounced "eyes") is a South Korean band formed by Music K Entertainment in 2017. They debuted on August 31, 2017, with All You Want.

Members
 Hyunjun (현준) – guitar, leader
 Jihoo (지후) – vocals
 Woosu (우수) – drums
 Junyoung (준영) – bass

Discography

Extended plays

Single albums

Singles

Awards and nominations

Soribada Best K-Music Awards

Korean Culture Entertainment Awards

The Fact Music Awards

References

External links
 

South Korean boy bands
South Korean dance music groups
Musical groups established in 2017
K-pop music groups
Musical groups from Seoul
2017 establishments in South Korea
South Korean pop rock music groups
Musical quartets